The Big Story or Big Story may refer to:

 "Big Story" (song), 2004 song by Steven Curtis Chapman
 The Big Story (radio and TV series), a radio and television series that aired on NBC in the 1940s and 1950s
 The Big Story (talk show), an American talk show that aired on Fox News Channel from 2000 to 2008
 The Big Story (film), a 1994 British animated film
 The Big Story (TV program), a Philippine newscast show that aired on Bloomberg TV Philippines from 2016 to 2018 and on One News since 2018.